Krasnołąka  is a village in the administrative district of Gmina Działdowo. It is within Działdowo County, Warmian-Masurian Voivodeship in northern Poland.

The village has a population of 320.

References

Villages in Działdowo County